Kévin Mauvieux (born 9 September 1991) is a French politician of the National Rally and has been a member of the National Assembly for Eure's 3rd constituency since 2022.

Mauvieux worked as an insurance broker before getting involved in politics. He first joined the Union for a Popular Movement at the age of 18 which was later reconstituted as The Republicans. Mauvieux has stated that he would not have voted for the Front National under its previous leadership but supports the policies of Marine Le Pen and argued that the Republicans were moving too close to the ruling En Marche! (LREM) party under Emmanuel Macron, saying "the Republicans have become the branch of LREM."

He joined the National Rally in 2022 and was elected as a municipal councilor for the party in Pont-Audemer. He contested the constituency of Eure's 3rd during the 2022 French legislative election. He subsequently won the seat.

References

1991 births
Living people
National Rally (France) politicians
Deputies of the 16th National Assembly of the French Fifth Republic
Members of Parliament for Eure